The 2001 Viennese state election was held on 25 March 2001 to elect the members of the Gemeinderat and Landtag of Vienna.

The election was won by the Social Democratic Party of Austria (SPÖ), who reclaimed the absolute majority in the Gemeinderat and Landtag which they had lost in 1996. This came to the detriment of the Freedom Party of Austria (FPÖ), which suffered substantial losses; the Liberal Forum (LIF) also lost all its seats after only one term in the Landtag. The Greens made modest gains, and the Austrian People's Party (ÖVP) saw a slight improvement.

With its majority in both the Landtag and city government recovered, the SPÖ terminated its coalition with the ÖVP and returned to governing alone.

Background
The Viennese constitution mandates that cabinet positions in the city government (city councillors) be allocated between parties proportionally in accordance with the share of votes won by each; this is known as Proporz. The number of city councillors is voted upon by the Landtag after each election, and may legally vary between nine and fifteen. City councillors are divided into two groups – "senior" councillors, who hold a cabinet portfolio, and "non-executive" councillors who do not. Non-executive councillors may vote in cabinet meetings, but do not otherwise hold any government responsibility. In practice, parties seek to form a coalition which holds a majority in both the Landtag and city government. City councillors bound to the coalition become senior councillors, while the opposition are relegated to non-executive status.

In the 1996 state election, the SPÖ lost its absolute majority for the first time in history, falling to 39.2%, by far its worst ever result. The ÖVP and Greens also suffered losses, with the FPÖ made significant gains, and its centrist splinter Liberal Forum debuted at 8%. The SPÖ also fell short of a majority in the city government, winning seven of fourteen councillors. The FPÖ won four, the ÖVP two, and the Greens one. The SPÖ subsequently formed a coalition with the ÖVP.

Electoral system
The 100 seats of the Gemeinderat and Landtag of Vienna are elected via open list proportional representation in a two-step process. The seats are distributed between eighteen multi-member constituencies. For parties to receive any representation in the Landtag, they must either win at least one seat in a constituency directly, or clear a 5 percent state-wide electoral threshold. Seats are distributed in constituencies according to the Hare quota, with any remaining seats allocated using the D'Hondt method at the state level, to ensure overall proportionality between a party's vote share and its share of seats.

Contesting parties
The table below lists parties represented in the previous Landtag.

In addition to the parties already represented in the Landtag, three parties collected enough signatures to be placed on the ballot.

 Communist Party of Austria (KPÖ)
 Socialist Left Party (SLP) – on the ballot only in Centre
 Bill Clinton – Handy Börse Fanclub (BCH)

Results

Results by constituency

References

Viennese state election
State elections in Austria
Viennese state election
Politics of Vienna